Inanda Dam is an earth-fill type dam located on the Mgeni River, near Inanda, KwaZulu-Natal, South Africa. It was established in 1989 and its primary purpose is to serve for domestic and industrial use.

See also
List of reservoirs and dams in South Africa
List of rivers of South Africa

References 

 List of South African Dams from the Department of Water Affairs and Forestry (South Africa)

Dams in South Africa
Dams completed in 1989